Gerardo Cavallieri (born 1942) is a former Argentine cyclist. He competed in the individual road race at the 1968 Summer Olympics where he did not finish.

References

External links
 

1942 births
Living people
Argentine male cyclists
Olympic cyclists of Argentina
Cyclists at the 1968 Summer Olympics